Svojanov is a market town in Svitavy District in the Pardubice Region of the Czech Republic. It has about 400 inhabitants.

Administrative parts

Villages of Dolní Lhota, Hutě, Předměstí, Starý Svojanov and Studenec are administrative parts of Svojanov.

Geography
It lies on the border of the Upper Svratka Highlands and Svitavy Uplands. The market town is situated in the valley of the river Křetínka.

History
The Svojanov Castle was built in 1224. During the reign Ottokar II of Bohemia, it was used for protection of the trade route from Bohemia to Moravia. The first written mention of Svojanov settlement below the castle is from 1287. It was then owned by Zavis of Falkenstein, who had the small fortress extended into a big Gothic castle. The village of Starý Svojanov ("Old Svojanov") was founded in the 13th century and supposedly is the oldest part of today's municipality.

In 1421 Svojanov was besieged by Jan Žižka and between 1642 and 1645 the market town was occupied by the Swedish army. In December 1798 the Russian legions marched through Svojanov to fight against Napoleon.

Sights
Svojanov Castle is one of the oldest stone castles in the country. Since 1910, it is owned by the town of Polička. The castle ruins and the Empire style palace are open to the public and often are used for cultural purposes.

An interesting sight is the Church of Saint Nicholas with a 13th-century chancel and fresco decoration which dates back to the period of Charles IV.

References

External links

Svojanov Castle official website
Svojanov Castle unofficial website

Populated places in Svitavy District
Market towns in the Czech Republic